Founded in 2004, Sacred Heart is a vibrant Catholic liberal arts academy with a strong college preparatory curriculum, located in Jackson, Tennessee. Based on the philosophy of St. John Bosco and welcoming students of all faiths, our mission is to educate outstanding young men and women through the principles of "Religion, Reason, and Loving Kindness".

Notes and references

External links
 School Website

Educational institutions established in 1900
Roman Catholic Diocese of Memphis
Catholic secondary schools in Tennessee
Schools in Madison County, Tennessee
1900 establishments in Tennessee